Anvil is an unincorporated community in Belmont County, Ohio, United States.

References

Unincorporated communities in Belmont County, Ohio
Unincorporated communities in Ohio